Pietro Tamiazzo (born 5 April 1945) is an Italian racing cyclist. He rode in the 1970 Tour de France.

References

External links
 

1945 births
Living people
Italian male cyclists
Place of birth missing (living people)
Cyclists from the Province of Lodi